"Tennessee" by Vivian Rorie is one of several official state songs of the U.S. state of Tennessee, adopted in 1992.

References

Songs about Tennessee
United States state songs